Mike Reeves may refer to:
 Mike Reeves (footballer)
 Mike Reeves (baseball)